Casey Cizikas (born February 27, 1991) is a Canadian professional ice hockey centre for the New York Islanders of the National Hockey League (NHL). He spent four seasons with the Mississauga St. Michaels Majors of the Ontario Hockey League (OHL), where he had two 20-goal seasons. Cizikas was selected by the Islanders in the fourth round, 92nd overall, of the 2009 NHL Entry Draft. He began playing for their minor league affiliate, the American Hockey League (AHL)'s Bridgeport Sound Tigers, two years after the draft, during the 2011–12 season; he was recalled to the Islanders' NHL roster mid-season.

Playing career

The Mississauga St. Michael's Majors selected Cizikas with their first selection, third overall, in the 2007 Ontario Hockey League (OHL) Priority Selection draft. He made his OHL debut in the 2007–08 season, finishing tenth in rookie scoring with 41 points in 62 games.

At the 2009 NHL Entry Draft, Cizikas was selected by the New York Islanders with their fourth round pick, 92nd overall. He returned to the Majors for the 2009–10 season, where he tied for the team lead in scoring with 62 points and led with a plus-minus rating of +32. Cizikas served as their captain in the 2010–11 season, where he recorded 64 points. He added 19 more in the OHL playoffs that year, leading the Majors to the championship series, which they ultimately lost to the Owen Sound Attack in seven games.

Cizikas spent the majority of the 2011–12 season in the American Hockey League (AHL) with the Islanders' minor league affiliate, the Bridgeport Sound Tigers. He scored his first two goals with the team on October 18, 2011, against the Providence Bruins, and was second in team scoring with 45 points by the end of the season. He was recalled by the Islanders during the season, and made his NHL debut on February 24, 2012, against the New York Rangers. He appeared in 15 games with the Islanders that season and recorded four assists. His first two NHL points came on March 1, 2012, against the Philadelphia Flyers. After returning to the Sound Tigers, an upper body injury prevented him from playing in the team's last five games of the regular season, but he returned in time for the playoffs.

As a result of the 2012–13 NHL lockout, Cizikas began the season with the Sound Tigers. He had 21 points in 31 games with Bridgeport before the labour dispute was settled and he was recalled to the Islanders. He then scored his first career NHL goal on January 29, 2013, against goaltender Marc-André Fleury of the Pittsburgh Penguins. Cizikas finished the season with six goals and 15 points in 45 regular season games, then added four points in six Stanley Cup playoff games.

During the 2015–16 campaign, Cizikas' line, consisting of him, Matt Martin, and Cal Clutterbuck was considered to be the best 4th line in the NHL by hockey analysts. Cizikas is commonly considered to be one of the best fourth line players in the NHL. On June 2, 2016, Cizikas signed a new five-year contract with the Islanders. On April 5, 2018, Cizikas was presented with the Islanders' Bob Nystrom Award for 2017–18. On May 24, 2019, Cizikas received his second Bob Nystrom Award.

On September 1, 2021, Cizikas was re-signed to a six-year, $15 million contract by the Islanders.

International play

Cizikas made two appearances with the Canadian national junior team program during the 2008–09 season. He was first a member of the Team Ontario squad that won the gold medal in the 2008 World U17 Hockey Challenge during the season, then won gold with the under-18 national team at the 2008 Ivan Hlinka Memorial Tournament following his OHL season.

During the 2011–12 season, Cizikas was a surprise pick for the national junior team at the 2011 World Junior Ice Hockey Championships. He recorded two goals and one assist to help Canada win a silver medal.

Playing style
Cizikas, in his first full season with the Islanders, was described as a player with a lot of energy and intensity whose offensive skills have improved over time. His forecheck has been called relentless and he became known for being willing to create energy by throwing his body around the ice.

Personal life
During a rugby football game in 2007, Cizikas tackled Manny Castillo in what was described by Cizikas as a "headlock." Castillo died of a head injury two days later; it was noted by physicians that two weeks prior to the battle with Cizikas, Castillo suffered a major concussion. One doctor testified that Castillo's concussion was severe enough that it should have kept him out of competition with physical contact for a full year. The Castillo family supported Cizikas throughout his ordeal and believed the death to have been accidental, asking that Cizikas be spared punishment. Their request could not be met, however, because Peel Regional Police supported Cizikas' conviction, as the tackle led to a death. Castillo's father provided a statement that called for fighting in youth hockey to be abolished, but again did not blame Cizikas for his son's death.

In 2009, Cizikas was found guilty of manslaughter by Judge Bruce Duncan, who believed Cizikas used "unnecessary force." He was given a sentence of one year probation and 100 hours of community service.

Career statistics

Regular season and playoffs

International

References

External links

 
 Casey Cizikas statistics at Yahoo! Sports

1991 births
Living people
Bridgeport Sound Tigers players
Canadian ice hockey centres
Canadian people of English descent
Canadian people of Lithuanian descent
Ice hockey people from Toronto
Mississauga St. Michael's Majors players
New York Islanders draft picks
New York Islanders players